Ameli Koloska, née Isermeyer (born 28 September 1944, in Dessau) is a retired West German javelin thrower. She competed for the VfL Wolfsburg, USC Mainz and TSV Nieder-Olm sports clubs during her active career.

International competitions

1944 births
Living people
People from Dessau-Roßlau
West German female javelin throwers
German female javelin throwers
Olympic athletes of West Germany
Athletes (track and field) at the 1968 Summer Olympics
Athletes (track and field) at the 1972 Summer Olympics
European Athletics Championships medalists
Sportspeople from Saxony-Anhalt